Secreted and transmembrane protein 1 is a protein that in humans is encoded by the SECTM1 gene.

This gene encodes a transmembrane and secreted protein with characteristics of a type 1a transmembrane protein. It is found in a perinuclear Golgi-like pattern and thought to be involved in hematopoietic and/or immune system processes.

References

Further reading